Alexander Brady (9 February 1870 – 19 October 1913) was a Scottish professional footballer who played as an inside forward. Upon his death, the Sheffield Evening Telegraph described him as being "in his day one of the best forwards in the country".

Career

Sunderland and Burnley
Brady started his career with his local junior side Renton Thistle before moving to Newcastle West End. Prior to the 1888–89 season he moved to Sunderland, then on to Gainsborough Trinity F.C. for a matter of weeks before joining Burnley during the inaugural season of the English Football League in 1888–89. He returned to Sunderland when the league fixtures ended in March 1889, then turned out for neighbours Sunderland Albion from the end of April.

Everton
In August 1889 Brady had been convinced to join Everton by their captain Andrew Hannah, also from Alec's hometown of Renton. However a dispute with his player registration meant he was given a two-month suspension. After scoring twice on his debut against Stoke and a hat-trick in the 11–2 against Derby in the FA Cup (Everton's record victory), they narrowly missed out on winning the league title to Preston North End. In his second season with Everton, they were crowned English League Champions.

Celtic and Sheffield Wednesday
In the summer of 1891 he was lured back to Scotland along with Everton teammate Dan Doyle to play for Celtic in the second season of the Scottish Football League. Despite narrowly missing out on the league title to Dumbarton, they went on to win the Scottish Cup, the club's first ever major trophy.

Brady spent just one season at Celtic before returning to England with The Wednesday, where he remained for seven seasons. He was a part of the Wednesday side that won the FA Cup in 1896, making Brady one of the first players to win both the Scottish and English trophies at a time when they were considered the pinnacle of football competitions.

He returned to Scotland to play with Clydebank in 1899 before returning to his hometown team, Renton where he ended his playing career.

After retiring from football he stayed in Renton, where he lived with his family until his death in 1913, aged 43. He was buried in Millburn Church, Renton which was marked with a memorial headstone in April 2016 by The Celtic Graves Society and Everton Heritage Society.

Honours
Everton
English Football League: 1890–91

Celtic
Scottish Cup: 1892
Glasgow Cup: 1891
Glasgow Merchants Charity Cup: 1892

The Wednesday
FA Cup: 1896

Notes and references

Scottish footballers
Association football forwards
Footballers from West Dunbartonshire
Burnley F.C. players
Gainsborough Trinity F.C. players
Newcastle West End F.C. players
Sunderland A.F.C. players
Sunderland Albion F.C. players
Everton F.C. players
Celtic F.C. players
Sheffield Wednesday F.C. players
Renton F.C. players
FA Cup Final players
English Football League players
Scottish Junior Football Association players
Scottish Football League players
1870 births
1913 deaths
People from Renton, West Dunbartonshire